Lansford Spence (born 15 December 1982) is a Jamaican sprinter. Together with Sanjay Ayre, Brandon Simpson and Davian Clarke he won a bronze medal in 4 x 400 metres relay at the 2005 World Championships in Athletics. He also competed in the individual contest, but was knocked out in the semi final. In 2006 the relay team won another bronze medal at the Commonwealth Games. He won a Commonwealth Games Silver medal in the 200m in 2010.

He was one of five athletes (along with Yohan Blake, Marvin Anderson, Allodin Fothergill and Sheri-Ann Brooks) who failed their doping tests at the 2009 Jamaican National Championships. All five tested positive for banned stimulant methylxanthine. Spence received a three-month doping ban for the infraction.

Personal bests 
 200 metres - 20.33 Wind +0.5 (2011, done at altitude)
 400 metres - 44.77 (2005)

Achievements

See also
List of doping cases in athletics

References

External links
 

1982 births
Living people
Jamaican male sprinters
Athletes (track and field) at the 2003 Pan American Games
Athletes (track and field) at the 2006 Commonwealth Games
Athletes (track and field) at the 2008 Summer Olympics
Athletes (track and field) at the 2010 Commonwealth Games
Athletes (track and field) at the 2011 Pan American Games
Olympic athletes of Jamaica
Commonwealth Games bronze medallists for Jamaica
Doping cases in athletics
Jamaican sportspeople in doping cases
World Athletics Championships medalists
Commonwealth Games medallists in athletics
Pan American Games medalists in athletics (track and field)
Pan American Games gold medalists for Jamaica
Pan American Games silver medalists for Jamaica
Central American and Caribbean Games silver medalists for Jamaica
Competitors at the 2002 Central American and Caribbean Games
Central American and Caribbean Games medalists in athletics
Medalists at the 2003 Pan American Games
Medalists at the 2011 Pan American Games
Medallists at the 2006 Commonwealth Games
Medallists at the 2010 Commonwealth Games